Eastern Orthodoxy in Italy refers to adherents, religious communities, institutions and organizations of Eastern Orthodox Christianity in Italy. In 2014, there were 14 distinctive Eastern Orthodox jurisdictions on the territory of Italy, some of them belonging to canonical Eastern Orthodox churches, while others are classified as independent (noncanonical). First session of the Council of Canonical Orthodox Bishops in Italy was held in 2009.

The main canonical Eastern Orthodox churches and ecclesiastical jurisdictions in Italy are as follows:

 Greek Orthodox Archdiocese of Italy (officially Sacred Orthodox Archdiocese of Italy and Exarchate of Southern Europe), a diocese of the Ecumenical Patriarchate of Constantinople, officially recognized by the Italian government under the otto per mille scheme,
 Serbian Orthodox Vicariate of Italy, under the jurisdiction of Serbian Orthodox Eparchy of Austria and Switzerland,
 Romanian Orthodox Diocese of Italy, a diocese of the Romanian Metropolis of Western and Southern Europe,
 Patriarchal parishes in Italy, a jurisdiction of the Russian Orthodox Church in Italy,
 Parishes of the Bulgarian Orthodox Church in Italy,
 Parishes of the Georgian Orthodox Church in Italy.
 Parishes of the Macedonian Orthodox Church - Metropolitanate of Europe.

Other Eastern Orthodox jurisdictions in Italy are:

 Metropolitan of Aquilea, and independent organization founded in 1978 by Archimandrite Evloghios Hessler, the head of a Russian Church in Italy, following the Russian tradition, with followers in Italy, Switzerland, France, Spain, and Germany,
 Parishes of Greek Old Calendarists in Italy,
 Orthodox Church in Italy, an independent organization,

See also
 Saint Spyridon Church, Trieste

References

Bibliography

External links
 CESNUR: Chiese ortodosse e antico orientali in Italia
 Consiglio Episcopale Ortodosso d’italia e Malta
 Romanian Orthodox Metropolis of Western and Southern Europe